Acidovorax is a genus of within the family Comamonadaceae. The genus contains some plant pathogens, such as Acidovorax avenae, which causes bacterial fruit blotch on cucurbit crops. Other Acidovorax sp. perform Fe(II) oxidation in anaerobic environments, forming iron minerals in the soil.

References

External links
Acidovorax LPSN List of Prokaryotic names with Standing in Nomenclature
The Microbial Ecology and Genomics Research Laboratory

Comamonadaceae
Bacteria genera